Sir Ralph Edwin Hotchkin Griffith  (4 March 1882 – 11 December 1963) was an administrator in British India and served as the last Chief Commissioner and the first Governor of the North-West Frontier Province during the British Raj.

Education and early career
Ralph Edwin Hotchkin Griffith was the younger brother of Sir Francis Griffith and the son of Francis Robert Griffith (1828–1901) Educated at Blundell's School and the Royal Military College. He was commissioned in 1901 into the Middlesex Regiment and transferred to the Indian Army and the 26th Prince of Wales's Own Light Cavalry in 1903 and was promoted to Lieutenant in 1903. He was appointed Adjutant of the Governor's Body Guard, Bombay from 1907 to 1908.

Griffith joined the Indian Political Service (which was then recruited half and half from the Indian Army and the Indian Civil Service) in November 1908. and served an apprenticeship under Sir George Roos-Keppel, who, like him, was a fluent speaker of Pashto. He was promoted Captain in 1910 and Major in 1916.

His early positions included Deputy Commissioner of Peshawar, secretary to the head of the Province, and Resident in the turbulent region of Waziristan, where his influence and understanding of the Wazir tribesmen reduced tensions in the area.

When Assistant Political Agent, Mohmand he was mentioned in dispatches for services on the North West Frontier during the early part of World War I.

Governor of the North-West Frontier Province
Griffith succeeded Stuart Pearks as Chief Commissioner of the North-West Frontier Province in 1931. He became the first Governor in 1932, when the importance of the northern shield was recognised by the raising of the status of the Pathan land to that of a Governor's province. He served as Governor until 1937, during the formative inter-war period.

Griffith was appointed a Companion of the Order of the Indian Empire in 1917, promoted to Lieutenant-Colonel in 1927, and was made Knight Commander of the Order of the Star of India in 1932.

Sources
Obituary, Lt-Col. Sir Ralph Griffith, The Times, 13 December 1963; p. 17; Issue 55883; column D

References

1882 births
1963 deaths
People educated at Blundell's School
Graduates of the Royal Military College, Sandhurst
British Indian Army officers
Indian Political Service officers
Military personnel of British India
Knights Commander of the Order of the Star of India
Companions of the Order of the Indian Empire
Knights Bachelor